Filelight is a graphical disk usage analyzer part of the KDE Gear.

Instead of showing a tree view of the files within a partition or directory, or even a columns-represent-directories view like xdiskusage, it shows a series of concentric pie charts representing the various directories within the requested partition or directory and the amount of space they use. This method is known as a multilevel pie chart, sunburst chart or ring chart. Users may also on the pie-chart segment representing a particular directory and repeat the analysis for that directory, right click that segment to open a file manager or terminal emulator in that location, or copy to clipboard or delete the directory, and right click the segment representing a file to open it, copy it to the clipboard, or delete it.

See also

 Scanner (software)

References

External links
 KDE Utils Project page
 Official Git Repository

Disk usage analysis software
Extragear
Free system software
KDE
Software that uses Qt